Social peer-to-peer processes are interactions with a peer-to-peer dynamic. These peers can be humans or computers. Peer-to-peer (P2P) is a term that originated from the popular concept of the P2P distributed computer application architecture which partitions tasks or workloads between peers. This application structure was popularized by file sharing systems like Napster, the first of its kind in the late 1990s.

The concept has inspired new structures and philosophies in many areas of human interaction. P2P human dynamic affords a critical look at current authoritarian and centralized social structures. Peer-to-peer is also a political and social program for those who believe that in many cases, peer-to-peer modes are a preferable option.

Definition 
P2P is a specific form of relational dynamic, based on the assumed equipotency of its participants, organized through the free cooperation of equals in view of the performance of a common task, for the creation of a common good, with forms of decision making and autonomy that are widely distributed throughout the network.

There are several fundamental aspects of social P2P processes:
 peer production - the collaborative production of use-value is open to participation and use to the widest possible number (as defined by Yochai Benkler, in his essay Coase's Penguin);
 peer governance - production or project is governed by the community of producers themselves, not by market allocation or corporate hierarchy;
 peer property - the use-value of property is freely accessible on a universal basis; peer services and products are distributed through new modes of property, which are not exclusive, though recognize individual authorship (i.e. the GNU General Public License or the Creative Commons licenses).

Peer production does not produce commodities for exchange value and does not use the price mechanism or corporate hierarchy to determine the allocation of resources. It must, therefore, be distinguished from both the capitalist market (though it can be linked and embedded in the broader market) and from production through state and corporate planning; as a mode of governance it differs from traditional linear hierarchies; and as a mode of property it differs from both traditional private property and state-based collective public property; it is rather the common property of its producers and users and the whole of humankind. Unlike private property, peer property is inclusive rather than exclusive — its nature is to share ownership as widely, rather than as narrowly, as possible.

Characteristics 
P2P processes are not structureless but are characterized by dynamic and changing structures that adapt themselves to phase changes. Its rules are not derived from external authority, as in hierarchical systems, but are generated from within. It does not deny ‘authority’, but only fixed forced hierarchy, and therefore accepts authority based on expertise, initiation of the project, etc. P2P may be the first true meritocracy. P2P eliminates most, if not all, barriers to entry. The threshold for participation is kept as low as possible. Equipotency means that there is no prior formal filtering for participation, but rather that it is the immediate practice of cooperation which determines the expertise and level of participation. Communication is not top-down and based on strictly defined reporting rules, but feedback is systemic, integrated into the protocol of the cooperative system. Techniques of 'participation capture' and other social accounting make automatic cooperation the default scheme of the project. Personal identity becomes partly generated by the contribution to the common project. P2P characteristics have been studied by Howard Rheingold et al.'''s Cooperation Project.

P2P is a network, not a linear or 'pyramidal' hierarchy (though it may have elements of it); it is 'decentralized'; intelligence is not located at any center, but everywhere within the system. Assumed equipotency means that P2P systems start from the premise that ‘it doesn’t know where the needed resource will be located’, it assumes that ‘everybody’ can cooperate, and does not use formal rules in advance to determine its participating members. Participants are expected to self-select the module that corresponds best to their expertise. Equipotency, i.e. the capacity to cooperate, is verified in the process of cooperation itself. Validation of knowledge, acceptance of processes, are determined by the collective through the use of digital rules which are embedded in the project's basic protocol. Cooperation must be free, not forced, and not based on neutrality (i.e. the buying of cooperation in a monetary system). It exists to produce something. It enables the widest possible participation. These are a number of characteristics that we can use to describe P2P systems ‘in general’, and in particular as it emerges in the human lifeworld. Whereas participants in hierarchical systems are subject to the panoptism of the select few who control the vast majority, in P2P systems, participants have access to holoptism, the ability for any participant to see the whole.

 Infrastructure 
The first requirement to facilitate the emergence of peer-to-peer processes is the existence of a technological infrastructure that enables distributed access to fixed capital. Individual computers that enable a universal machine capable of executing any logical task are a form of distributed fixed capital, available at low cost to many producers. The internet, as a point to point network, was specifically designed for participation by the edges (computer users) without the use of obligatory hubs. Although it is not fully in the hands of its participants, the internet is controlled through distributed governance, and outside the complete hegemony of particular private or state actors. The Internet's hierarchical elements, such as the stacked IP protocols and Domain Name System, do not deter participation. Viral communicators, or meshworks, are a logical extension of the internet. With this methodology, devices create their own networks through the use of excess capacity, bypassing the need for a pre-existing infrastructure. Wireless community networks, Open Spectrum advocacy, file-serving television, and alternative meshwork-based telecommunication infrastructures are exemplary of this trend.

The second requirement is alternative information and communication systems which allow for autonomous communication between cooperating agents. The web (in particular the Writeable Web and the Web 2.0 that is in the process of being established) allows for the universal autonomous production, dissemination, and 'consumption' of written material while the associated podcasting and webcasting developments create an 'alternative information and communication infrastructure' for audio and audiovisual creation. The existence of such an infrastructure enables autonomous content production that may be distributed without the intermediary of the classic publishing and broadcasting media (though new forms of mediation may arise).

The third requirement is the existence of a 'software' infrastructure for autonomous global cooperation. A growing number of collaborative tools, such as blogs and wikis, embedded in social networking software facilitate the creation of trust and social capital, making it possible to create global groups that can create use-value without the intermediary of manufacturing or distribution by for-profit enterprises.

The fourth requirement is a legal infrastructure that enables the creation of use-value and protects it from private appropriation. The General Public License (which prohibits the appropriation of software code), the related Open Source Initiative, and certain versions of the Creative Commons license fulfill this role. They enable the protection of common use-value and use viral characteristics to spread. GPL and related material can only be used in projects that in turn put their adapted source code in the public domain.

The fifth requirement is cultural. The diffusion of mass intellectuality, (i.e. the distribution of human intelligence) and associated changes in ways of feeling and being (ontology), ways of knowing (epistemology) and value constellations (axiology) have been instrumental in creating the type of cooperative individualism needed to sustain an ethos which can enable P2P projects.

 In the economy 

 Capitalism 
There are two important aspects to the emergence of P2P in the economic sphere. On the one hand, as a format for peer production processes, it is emerging as a 'third mode of production' based on the cooperation of autonomous agents. Indeed, if the first mode of production was laissez-faire based capitalism, and the second mode was the model of a centrally-planned economy, then the third mode is defined neither by the motor of profit, nor by central planning: to allocate resources and make decisions, it does not use market and pricing mechanisms, or managerial commands, but instead uses social relations. Peer production is a significant part of the mainstream economy, even if it is not much advertised as such in mainstream economic literature.

Despite significant differences, P2P and the capitalist market are highly interconnected. P2P is dependent on the market and the market is dependent on P2P. Peer production produces use-value through mostly immaterial production, without directly providing an income for its producers. Participants cannot live from peer production, though they derive meaning and value from it.

The market and capitalism are also dependent on P2P. Capitalism has become a system relying on distributed networks, in particular on the P2P infrastructure in computing and communication. Productivity is highly reliant on cooperative teamwork, most often organized in ways that are derivative of peer production's governance. The support given by major IT companies to open-source development is a testimony to the use derived from even the new common property regimes. The general business model seems to be that businesses use the P2P infrastructure, and create a surplus value through services, which can be packaged for exchange value. For-profit enterprises mostly use partial implementations of P2P. Amazon built itself around user reviews, eBay lives on a platform of worldwide distributed auctions, and Google is constituted by user-generated content. Value creation today is no longer confined to the enterprise, but beholden to the mass intellectuality of knowledge workers, who through their lifelong learning/experiencing and systemic connectivity, constantly innovate within and without the enterprise. Yet more recently, in the last decade, peer-to-peer exchanges have become even more prevalent in the so-called "sharing economy", also termed an "access economy" or a "peer exchange economy." For instance, businesses such as Uber, Lyft, and Airbnb are all based on peer-to-peer physical exchanges. This sharing economy is projected by some analysts to encompass $335 billion by 2025.

Peer-to-peer systems contribute to more specific forms of distributed capitalism. The massive use of open source software in business, enthusiastically supported by venture capital and large IT companies such as IBM, is creating a distributed software platform that will drastically undercut the monopolistic rents enjoyed by companies such as Microsoft and Oracle, while Skype and VoIP will drastically redistribute the telecom infrastructure. It also points to a new business model that is 'beyond' products, focusing instead on services associated with the nominally free FS/OS software model. Industries are gradually transforming themselves to incorporate user-generated innovation, and new intermediation may occur around user-generated media. Many knowledge workers are choosing non-corporate paths and becoming mini-entrepreneurs, relying on an increasingly sophisticated participatory infrastructure, a kind of digital corporate commons.

 Market economy 
Social P2P systems are different from market economy: neither market pricing nor managerial command are required for P2P processes to make decisions regarding the allocation of resources. There are further differences:

 Market economy is similar to insect-like swarm intelligence. There are autonomous agents in a distributed environment, but each individual only sees their own immediate benefit.
 Markets are based on 'neutral' cooperation, and not on synergistic cooperation: no reciprocity is created.
 Markets operate on the production and exchange of value to generate profit, not production for use.
 Whereas P2P aims at full participation, markets only fulfill the needs of those with purchasing power.

Markets do not function well for common needs that do not involve direct payment (national defense, general policing, education and public health). In addition, they fail to take into account negative externalities (the environment, social costs, future generations).

 P2P economic system 
In The Political Economy of Peer Production Bauwens regards P2P phenomena as an emerging alternative to capitalist society. P2P economy may be seen as extending or already existing outside the sphere of free/open source software production and other non-rival immaterial goods. Peer production effectively enables the free cooperation of producers, who have access to their own means of production, and the resulting use-value of the projects supersedes for-profit alternatives.

Historically, though forces of higher productivity may be temporarily embedded in the old productive system, they ultimately lead to deep upheavals and reconstitutions of the political economy. The emergence of capitalist modes within the feudal system is a case in point. This is particularly significant because leading sectors of the for-profit economy are deliberately slowing down productive growth (through patents and monopolization) and trying to outlaw P2P production and sharing practices.

 In politics 
 Governance 
Governments of countries are composed of a specialized and privileged body of individuals, who monopolize political decision-making. Their function is to enforce existing laws, legislate new ones, and arbitrate conflicts via their monopoly on violence. Legislation can be open to the general citizenry through open source governance, allowing policy development to benefit from the collected wisdom of the people as a whole.

Michel Bauwens has stated, that society is not a peer group with an a priori consensus, but rather a decentralized structure of competing groups and representative democracy cannot be replaced entirely by peer governance.

Peer projects which evolve beyond a certain scale and start facing issues of decisions about scarce resources, will probably adopt some representational mechanisms. Representative and bureaucratic decision-making can and will in some places be replaced by global governance networks which may be self-governed to a large extent, but in any case, it will and should incorporate more and more Multistakeholder Models (i.e. collaborative e-democracy), which strives to include all groups that could be affected. This group-based partnership model is different, but related in spirit, to the individual-based peer governance, because they share an ethos of participation.

 Open source movements 
Many new movements are taking on P2P organizational formats, such as the alter-globalization movement and the "Occupy" movement (i.e. Occupy Wall Street). The movements see itself as a network of networks that combines players from a wide variety of fields and opinion, who, despite the fact that they do not see eye to eye in all things, manage to unite around a common platform of action around certain key events.

They are able to mobilize vast numbers of people from every continent, without having at their disposal any of the traditional news media, such as television, radio or newspapers. Rather, they rely almost exclusively on the P2P technologies described above. Thus, Internet media are used for communication and learning on a continuous basis, prior to the mobilizations, and also during the mobilizations.

Independent Internet media platforms such as Indymedia, as well as the skillful use of mobile phones, are used for real-time response management, undertaken by small groups that use buddy-list technologies, and sometimes open-source programs that have been explicitly designed for political activism such as TextMob.

Many reports have appeared, including those described in Howard Rheingold's Smart Mobs, about the political significance of SMS in organizing successful protests and ‘democratic revolutions’. The network model allows for a more fluid organization that does not fix any group in a permanent adversarial position. Various temporary coalitions are created on an ad hoc basis depending on the issues.

 Notable contributors 
The following is a list of individuals who have made contributions to the peer-to-peer paradigm.
 Business and economics
 Eric Von Hippel, author of The Democratisation of Innovation, on user innovation communities
 Pekka Himanen, for his examination of the new work culture in 'Hacker Ethics'
 Peter Drucker author of Concept of the Corporation for term 'federal decentralization'
 Michel Bauwens, co-founder and primary activist of the P2P Foundation.
 Elinor Ostrom, for her work on Common Pool Resources (CPR).
 Rachel Botsman for co-writing 'What's Mine Is Yours: The Rise of Collaborative Consumption' (see Collaborative consumption)

 Culture
 Lawrence Lessig, created the Creative Commons licenses and is an advocate of Free Culture against the encroachments of excessive intellectual property restrictions
 Jimmy Wales, Wikipedia founder
 Dan Gillmor for his advocacy of citizen-based journalism
 Mark Pesce, for his campaign around the issue for an alternative information and communications infrastructure
 Howard Rheingold, for his books on the emerging sociality in the online world, such as Virtual Communities and Smart Mobs Philosophy and spirituality
 John Heron, founder of cooperative inquiry techniques in the field of spirituality
 Jorge Ferrer, author of Revisioning Transpersonal Psychology, an extended review of the development of participatory spirituality
 Henryk Skolimowski, author of The Participatory Mind David Skrbina, author of a history of the participatory worldview
 Gilles Deleuze and Félix Guattari, for their early anticipation of the 'rhizomatic' future

 Politics
 McKenzie Wark, author of a class analysis of the information age, and her hypothesis of the vectoralist class (owners of the vectors of information) in her book A Hacker Manifesto [2004]
 Toni Negri and Michael Hardt, for their analysis of the Multitudes in Empire and Multitude John Holloway, author of Revolution without Power David Bollier, Commons advocate
 Alexander R. Galloway, for his unveiling of the importance of protocol as a form of power, in his book Protocol [2003]
 Eben Moglen, founder of the Software Freedom Law Center

 Science
 Yochai Benkler, study of Commons-based peer production

 Technologies
 Vint Cerf - 'father' of the internet
 Richard Stallman, founder of the Free Software movement
 Eric Raymond, founder of the Open Source initiative
 Irene Greif, for her definition of an operational semantics for the actor model in 1975
 Robin Chase for work on Buzzcar
 Juliana Rotich for work on Ushahidi

See also

 Anarchist economics
 Collaborative e-democracy
 Commons-based peer production
 Distributed economies
 Distributism
 Leaderless resistance
 Network economy
 Occupy movement
 Open-source governance
 Participatory Guarantee Systems
 Peer education
 Peer mentoring
 Peer support
 Peer-to-peer
 Peer-to-peer banking
 Peer-to-peer carsharing
 Peer-to-peer lending
 Peer production
 Production for use
 Sharing economy
 Open design
 Heterarchy

References

 Abbate, Janet. Inventing the Internet. MIT Press, 1999 (describes the underlying P2P ethos of the internet's founding fathers)
 Aigrain, Philippe. Cause Commune. L'information entre bien commun et propriete. Fayard, 2005 (on the new Commons and associated social movements)
 Bauwens, M., 2005, Peer to Peer and Human Evolution Ferrer, Jorge N. Revisioning Transpersonal Theory: A Participatory Vision of Human Spirituality. SUNY, 2001 (outlines the new paradigm of participatory spirituality)
 Gilmor, Dan. We the Media. O'Reilly, 2004 (on participatory journalism)
 Gunderson, Lance H. and C.S. Holling. Panarchy: Understanding Transformations in Systems of Humans and Nature. Island Press, 2001 (on networked and P2P physical and social laws)
 Heron, John. Sacred Science. PCCS Books, 1998 (defines relational spirituality and the methodology called Cooperative Inquiry)
 Galloway, Alexander . Protocol: How Control Exists After Decentralization
MIT Press, 2004 (power as embedded in the digital protocols governing networked systems)
 Himanen, Pekka. The Hacker Ethic and the Spirit of the Information Age. Random House, 2002 (on the 'P2P' work culture exemplified by the hackers but spreading in the general economy)
 Lasica, J.D. Darknet: Hollywood's War against the Digital Generation. John Wiley & Sons, 2005 (cultural and political consequences of P2P filesharing)
 Malone, Thomas. The Future of Work. How the New Order of Business Will Shape Your Organization, Your Management Style, and Your Life. Harvard Business School Press, 2004 (coordination theory and decentralisation in the corporate enterprise)
 Ostrom, Elinor. Governing the Commons: The Evolution of Institutions for Collective Action. New York: Cambridge University Press, 1990 (how to manage the physical commons)
 Raymond, Eric. The Cathedral and the Bazaar. O’Reilly, 2001 (the gift economy culture of the free software and open source movements)
 Sagot-Duvauroux, Jean-Louis. Pour la Gratuite. Desclee-De Brouwer, 1995 (the gratuity of common goods as indicative of civilizational progress)
 Stallman, Richard. Free Software, Free Society. Free Software Foundation, 2002 (the ethos of the Free Software movement)
 Tuomi, Ilkka. Networks of Innovation. Oxford Press, 2003 (networked forms of innovation)
 von Hippel, Eric. The Democratization of Innovation. MIT Press, 2004 (examines participatory innovation starting from the users/consumers themselves)
 Weber, Steve. The Success of Open Source. Harvard University Press, 2004 (studies Open Source and peer production)

Further reading
 
How to Reap the Benefits of the “Digital Revolution”? Modularity and the Commons. 2019. By Vasilis Kostakis, published in Halduskultuur: The Estonian Journal of Administrative Culture and Digital Governance'', Vol 20(1):4–19.

Activism
Communication
Complex systems theory
Politics and technology
Peer-to-peer